The MTV Video Music Award for Best Choreography is a craft award given to the artist, the artist's manager, and choreographer of the music video.  From 1984 to 2007, the full name of the award was Best Choreography in a Video. The biggest winner is Frank Gatson with six wins. Michael Rooney follows closely behind with five wins.

Frank Gatson is also the most nominated choreographer with eleven nominations.  He is followed by Tina Landon with nine nominations (and yet only one win). The performers whose videos have won the most awards are Janet Jackson and Beyoncé, garnering a total of four Moonmen for choreography. Madonna's videos have received the most nominations with twelve.

Seven performers have won a Moonman in this category for their work choreographing or co-choreographing their own videos:  Michael Jackson ("Thriller"), Prince ("Raspberry Beret"), Paula Abdul ("Straight Up"), Janet Jackson ("Rhythm Nation"), Madonna ("Ray of Light"), Shakira ("Hips Don't Lie"), Bruno Mars ("Treasure"), and OK Go ("I Won't Let You Down"). An additional ten other performers/groups have been nominated for their work choreographing their own videos: Toni Basil, Morris Day, Bobby Brown, MC Hammer, Marky Mark and the Funky Bunch, Quad City DJ's, Jason Kay, Janelle Monáe, Beyoncé and Solange.

Actor Christopher Walken won this award in 2001 for helping choreograph the video for Fatboy Slim's "Weapon of Choice," in which he appears dancing. Similarly, Spike Jonze (as Richard Koufey) won this award in 1999 for his own dancing in Fatboy Slim's video "Praise You".

Recipients

References 

MTV Video Music Awards
Awards established in 1984